Alexis Rodríguez (born 1978) is a Cuban wrestler. He was Olympic bronze medalist in Freestyle wrestling in 2000. He is the world champion in 1998 . He also competed at the 2004 Olympics, where he placed fifth.

References 

1978 births
Living people
Olympic wrestlers of Cuba
Wrestlers at the 2000 Summer Olympics
Cuban male sport wrestlers
Wrestlers at the 2004 Summer Olympics
Olympic bronze medalists for Cuba
Olympic medalists in wrestling
Medalists at the 2000 Summer Olympics
Pan American Games medalists in wrestling
Pan American Games gold medalists for Cuba
Pan American Games silver medalists for Cuba
Wrestlers at the 1999 Pan American Games
World Wrestling Championships medalists
Medalists at the 1999 Pan American Games
20th-century Cuban people
21st-century Cuban people